William Turner (12 December 1844 – 19 January 1914) was a British Roman Catholic clergyman who served as the Bishop of Galloway from 1893 to 1914.

Born in Aberdeen, United Kingdom on 12 December 1844, he was ordained to the priesthood on 26 April 1868. He was appointed the Bishop of the Diocese of Galloway by the Holy See on 16 June 1893, and consecrated to the Episcopate on 25 July 1893. The principal consecrator was Archbishop Angus MacDonald of St Andrews and Edinburgh, and the principal co-consecrators were Bishop Hugh MacDonald of Aberdeen and Bishop James August Smith of Dunkeld (later Archbishop of St Andrews and Edinburgh).

He died in office on 19 January 1914, aged 69.

References

1844 births
1914 deaths
Clergy from Aberdeen
19th-century Roman Catholic archbishops in Scotland
Bishops of Galloway (Roman Catholic, Post-Reformation)
20th-century Roman Catholic archbishops in Scotland